Mieum may refer to:

 Mieum (hangul)
 Mieum (food)